Torrebruna is a comune and town in the province of Chieti in the Abruzzo region of Italy.

Main sights
Fortified borough of Torrebruna (13th and 18th centuries). It has a concentrical plan with the parish church at the center.
Fortified borough of Guardiabruna (16th and 18th centuries)
Church of Trasfigurazione di Nostro Signore Gesù Cristo (17th century)

References

Cities and towns in Abruzzo